Ronald Archie Nussbaum (born February 9, 1942) is an American herpetologist. He works with evolutionary biology and ecology of amphibians and reptiles, including systematics of caecilians and salamanders. He is a professor emeritus at the University of Michigan.

Education
Nussbaum possesses a bachelor's, master's, and doctorate in biology from the University of Idaho, Central Washington University, and Oregon State University, respectively.

Taxa described

Amietophrynus Frost, Grant, Faivovich, Bain, Haas, Haddad, de Sá, Channing, Wilkinson, Donnellan, Raxworthy, Campbell, Blotto, Moler, Drewes, Nussbaum, Lynch, Green & Wheeler, 2006
Amphiglossus anosyensis Raxworthy & Nussbaum, 1993
Amphiglossus mandokava Raxworthy & Nussbaum, 1993
Amphiglossus punctatus Raxworthy & Nussbaum, 1993
Atretochoana Nussbaum & Wilkinson, 1995
Boulengerula fischeri Nussbaum & Hinkel, 1994
Brookesia ambreensis Raxworthy & Nussbaum, 1995
Brookesia antakarana Raxworthy & Nussbaum, 1995
Brookesia bekolosy Raxworthy & Nussbaum, 1995
Brookesia brygooi Raxworthy & Nussbaum, 1995
Brookesia lineata Raxworthy & Nussbaum, 1995
Brookesia lolontany Raxworthy & Nussbaum, 1995
Calumma amber Raxworthy & Nussbaum, 2006
Calumma crypticum Raxworthy & Nussbaum, 2006
Calumma hafahafa Raxworthy & Nussbaum, 2006
Calumma jejy Raxworthy & Nussbaum, 2006
Calumma peltierorum Raxworthy & Nussbaum, 2006
Calumma tsycorne Raxworthy & Nussbaum, 2006
Chthonerpeton exile Nussbaum & Wilkinson, 1987
Chthonerpeton onorei Nussbaum, 1986
Chthonerpeton perissodus Nussbaum & Wilkinson, 1987
Crotaphatrema lamottei (Nussbaum, 1981)
Crotaphatrema Nussbaum, 1985
Dicamptodon copei Nussbaum, 1970
Duttaphrynus Frost, Grant, Faivovich, Bain, Haas, Haddad, de Sá, Channing, Wilkinson, Donnellan, Raxworthy, Campbell, Blotto, Moler, Drewes, Nussbaum, Lynch, Green & Wheeler, 2006
Ebenavia maintimainty Nussbaum & Raxworthy, 1998
Echinotriton Nussbaum & Brodie, 1982
Feihyla Frost, Grant, Faivovich, Bain, Haas, Haddad, de Sá, Channing, Wilkinson, Donnellan, Raxworthy, Campbell, Blotto, Moler, Drewes, Nussbaum, Lynch, Green & Wheeler, 2006
Heteroliodon fohy Glaw, Vences & Nussbaum, 2005
Heteroliodon lava Nussbaum & Raxworthy, 2000
Hypogeophis pti Maddock, Wilkinson, Nussbaum & Gower, 2017
Ingerophrynus Frost, Grant, Faivovich, Bain, Haas, Haddad, de Sá, Channing, Wilkinson, Donnellan, Raxworthy, Campbell, Blotto, Moler, Drewes, Nussbaum, Lynch, Green & Wheeler, 2006
Litoria michaeltyleri Frost, Grant, Faivovich, Bain, Haas, Haddad, de Sá, Channing, Wilkinson, Donnellan, Raxworthy, Campbell, Blotto, Moler, Drewes, Nussbaum, Lynch, Green & Wheeler, 2006
Madascincus minutus Raxworthy & Nussbaum, 1993
Matoatoa spannringi Nussbaum, Raxworthy & Pronk, 1998
Microcaecilia grandis Wilkinson, Nussbaum & Hoogmoed, 2010
Microcaecilia taylori Nussbaum & Hoogmoed, 1979
Microgale fotsifotsy Jenkins, Raxworthy & Nussbaum, 1997
Mimosiphonops reinhardti Wilkinson & Nussbaum, 1992
Paragehyra gabriellae Nussbaum & Raxworthy, 1994
Paroedura karstophila Nussbaum & Raxworthy, 2000
Paroedura maingoka Nussbaum & Raxworthy, 2000
Paroedura masobe Nussbaum & Raxworthy, 1994
Paroedura tanjaka Nussbaum & Raxworthy, 2000
Paroedura vahiny Nussbaum & Raxworthy, 2000
Paroedura vazimba Nussbaum & Raxworthy, 2000
Phelsuma antanosy Raxworthy & Nussbaum, 1993
Phelsuma malamakibo Nussbaum, Raxworthy, Raselimanana & Ramanamanjato, 2000
Phelsuma masohoala Raxworthy & Nussbaum, 1994
Plethodontohyla mihanika Vences, Raxworthy, Nussbaum & Glaw, 2003
Poyntonophrynus Frost, Grant, Faivovich, Bain, Haas, Haddad, de Sá, Channing, Wilkinson, Donnellan, Raxworthy, Campbell, Blotto, Moler, Drewes, Nussbaum, Lynch, Green & Wheeler, 2006
Pseudepidalea Frost, Grant, Faivovich, Bain, Haas, Haddad, de Sá, Channing, Wilkinson, Donnellan, Raxworthy, Campbell, Blotto, Moler, Drewes, Nussbaum, Lynch, Green & Wheeler, 2006
Pseudoacontias angelorum Nussbaum & Raxworthy, 1995
Pseudoxyrhopus analabe Nussbaum, Andreone & Raxworthy, 1998
Pseudoxyrhopus ankafinaensis Raxworthy & Nussbaum, 1994
Pseudoxyrhopus kely Raxworthy & Nussbaum, 1994
Pseudoxyrhopus sokosoko Raxworthy & Nussbaum, 1994
Rhinatrematidae Nussbaum, 1977
Scaphiophryne boribory Vences, Raxworthy, Nussbaum & Glaw, 2003
Sechellophryne Nussbaum & Wu, 2007
Trachylepis dumasi (Nussbaum & Raxworthy, 1995)
Trachylepis lavarambo (Nussbaum & Raxworthy, 1998)
Trachylepis nancycoutuae (Nussbaum & Raxworthy, 1998)
Trachylepis tandrefana (Nussbaum, Raxworthy & Ramanamanjato, 1999)
Trachylepis tavaratra (Ramanamanjato, Nussbaum & Raxworthy, 1999)
Trachylepis vato (Nussbaum & Raxworthy, 1994)
Trachylepis vezo (Ramanamanjato, Nussbaum & Raxworthy, 1999)
Trachylepis volamenaloha(Nussbaum, Raxworthy & Ramanamanjato, 1999)
Uraeotyphlus gansi Gower, Rajendran, Nussbaum & Wilkinson, 2008
Uroplatus malahelo Nussbaum & Raxworthy, 1994
Uroplatus malama Nussbaum & Raxworthy, 1995
Vandijkophrynus Frost, Grant, Faivovich, Bain, Haas, Haddad, de Sá, Channing, Wilkinson, Donnellan, Raxworthy, Campbell, Blotto, Moler, Drewes, Nussbaum, Lynch, Green & Wheeler, 2006
Zonosaurus anelanelany Raselimanana, Raxworthy & Nussbaum, 2000
Zonosaurus bemaraha Raselimanana, Raxworthy & Nussbaum, 2000
Zonosaurus maramaintso Raselimanana, Nussbaum & Raxworthy, 2006
Zonosaurus tsingy Raselimanana, Raxworthy & Nussbaum, 2000

Citations

1942 births
Living people
American herpetologists
University of Michigan faculty
People from Minidoka County, Idaho
University of Idaho alumni
Central Washington University alumni
Oregon State University alumni